Resende may refer to:

Places
 Resende, Rio de Janeiro, a municipality in the State of Rio de Janeiro, Brazil
 Resende, Portugal, a municipality in the district of Viseu, Portugal
 Resende (parish), a civil parish in the municipality of Resende, Portugal
 Resende (Paredes de Coura), a civil parish in the municipality of Paredes de Coura, Portugal

Other
 Resende Nuclear Fuel Factory
Resende Futebol Clube, Brazilian football club
Resende (footballer), Brazilian footballer

See also
 Nova Resende, a municipality in the State of Minas Gerais